This is a list of ministers of Justice and Police of the Republic of Suriname. Among its responsibilities, the ministry enforces human rights, provides social legal assistance, oversees policies regarding detainees, and maintains public order and peace in the country.

List of ministers

See also 

 Justice ministry
 Politics of Suriname

References 

Justice ministries
Government of Suriname